The 2008–09 Stanford Cardinal men's basketball team represented Stanford University during the 2008–09 NCAA Division I men's basketball season. The Cardinal were led by first year head coach Johnny Dawkins, and played their home games at Maples Pavilion as a member of the Pacific-10 Conference.

Previous season
The Cardinal began the year ranked in the top 25 in both polls and would stay  until a loss to Siena knocked them out. They did not see the rankings again until conference play where they would climb as high as seventh in the nation. After going 13–5 in conference play, the Cardinal received a two seed in the 2008 Pac-10 Conference tournament. Winning their first two games against Arizona and Washington State, Stanford would face UCLA. whom they lost two twice in the regular season, and just like the regular season would lose in the Finals 64–67.

Ranked 11th in the nation at the time, Stanford received a third seed in the 2008 NCAA tournament. They were placed in the South Region with a first round battle against 14 seed Cornell. Stanford would beat Cornell 78–53 and would face Marquette in the second round. Stanford and Marquette took the game into overtime and they came out on top of the Golden Eagles 82–81. Stanford reached the Sweet Sixteen for the first time since 2001 and their first time under Trent Johnson. Their Sweet Sixteen opponent was 2 seed Texas, but would come up short against the Longhorns 62–82.

At the end of the season, Trent Johnson moved on from Stanford University and accepted the LSU job. Stanford introduced Johnny Dawkins as head coach April 27, 2008.

Offseason

Departures

Incoming

Roster

Schedule and results

|-
!colspan=12 style=| Exhibition

|-
!colspan=12 style=| Regular season

|-
!colspan=12 style=| Pac-10 tournament

|-
!colspan=12 style=| College Basketball Invitational

Rankings

References 

Stanford Cardinal men's basketball seasons
Stanford
Stanford
Stanford Card
Stanford Card